Rabindra Raj Sharma is a Nepalese politician, belonging to the Nepal Communist Party currently serving as the member of the 1st Federal Parliament of Nepal. In the 2017 Nepalese general election he was elected from the Dailekh 1 constituency, securing 23773 (55.51%) votes.

References

Nepal MPs 2017–2022
Living people
Communist Party of Nepal (Unified Marxist–Leninist) politicians
1964 births